Yogi is a 2009 Indian Kannada-language film directed by Udaya Prakash, starring Yogesh, Bianca Desai and Sherin in the lead roles.

Cast

 Yogesh as Yogi
 Bianca Desai as Mala
 Sherin as Paddu
 Suchendra Prasad as Babu
 Praveen
 Sathish Ninasam as KK's brother
 Gururaj Hosakote
 Rekha Vedavyas in a special appearance

Music

Reception

Critical response 

R G Vijayasarathy of Rediff.com scored the film at 2 out of 5 stars and says "All in all Yogi is just an ordinary and predictable fare that is neither entertaining nor interesting. But for the quality of song compositions and its rich presentation, the film lags behind in every aspect of filmmaking. Except for the climax sequence which is well executed in Golkonda near Hyderabad, all the other fights look extremely ordinary". The Times of India scored the film at 2.5 out of 5 stars and wrote "Yogesh has improved a lot and excels. Biyanka has scope for improvement. Shirin as Paddu wins plaudits for her excellent performance. Suchendra Prasad shines. Emil's music and Dasari Seenu's camerawork are okay". Bangalore Mirror wrote "What Yogi lacks is not a good story but a gripping narrative. The inexperience of first-time director Uday Prakash is evident in this regard".

References

2000s Kannada-language films
2009 films